Alen Fetić (born 14 October 1991) is a Slovenian futsal player who plays for HMNK Rijeka and the Slovenian national futsal team.

References

External links
NZS profile 
UEFA profile

1991 births
Living people
Sportspeople from Ljubljana
Slovenian men's futsal players
Futsal forwards
Slovenian expatriate sportspeople in Croatia
Slovenian expatriate sportspeople in Serbia
Slovenian expatriate sportspeople in Italy